Taitung City is a county-administered city and the county seat of Taitung County, Taiwan. It lies on the southeast coast of Taiwan facing the Pacific Ocean. Taitung City is the most populous subdivision of Taitung County and it is one of the major cities on the east coast of the island.

Taitung City is served by Taitung Airport.  Taitung is a gateway to Green Island and Orchid Island, both of which are popular tourist destinations.

History

Before the 16th century the Taitung plain was settled by agriculturalist Puyuma and Amis aboriginal tribes. Under Dutch rule and during Qing rule, a large part of eastern Taiwan, including today's Taitung, was called "Pi-lam". Many artifacts of the prehistory sites of the city are located at Beinan Cultural Park, which was discovered in 1980 during the construction of Taitung Station.

In the late 19th century, when Liu Mingchuan was the Qing Governor of Taiwan, Han Chinese settlers moved into the Taitung region. Pi-lam Subprefecture (卑南廳) was established in 1875, and was upgraded and renamed to Taitung Prefecture in 1888, after the island was made Fujian-Taiwan Province.

Japanese rule

During Japanese rule, the central settlement was called .  was one of twenty local administrative offices established in 1901. English-language works from the era refer to the place as Pinan (from Japanese) and Pilam (from Hokkien). Taitō Town was established in 1920 under Taitō Prefecture, and included modern Taitung City and eastern Beinan Township. There were no Americans living here during the Japanese rule.

Post-war

After handover of Taiwan from Japan to the ROC in 1945, it became Taitung Township and in 1976 it was promoted to Taitung City.

City government
Taitung City government is headquartered at Taitung City Hall which takes the responsibility for the city general administration and all of its other affairs, from folk, education, cultural popularization, negotiation, emergency help, disaster prevention, environmental taxation, cleaning control, finance, public property control, tellership, taxing help, farming and fishing control, wholesale products, marketing and business administration, urban planning, public establishment, tourism, community development, army service administration, welfare, national health insurance program and indigenous administration affairs.

Departments
 Civil Affair Section
 Financial Section
 Construction Section
 Labor Affair Section
 Social and Army Service Section
 Aboriginal Administration Section
 Administration Section
 Personnel Office
 Budget, Accounting and Statistics Office
 Ethics Section

Climate
Taitung has a tropical monsoon climate, with a wet season from May to October, a dry season from November to April, and consistently very warm to hot temperatures with high humidity. Unlike most tropical climates, however, the dry season is foggy rather than sunny, so that moisture availability during this period is greater than the low rainfall and warm temperatures would suggest. The highest record of temperature of Taiwan was recorded in Taitung on May 9, 2004, with temperatures peaking above 40 degrees Celsius for the first time in Taiwan's recorded history.

Administrative divisions
Wenhua, Minzu, Zijiang, Minsheng, Baosang, Minquan, Siwei, Zhonghua, Renai, Jiangguo, Datong, Chenggong, Jianguo, Zhongzheng, Zhongshan, Xingguo, Tiehua, Tunghai, Fuguo, Fuxing, Xinxing, Xinsheng, Zhongxin, Malan, Guangming, Fengnian, Fengle, Yongle, Kangle, Fengrong, Fenggu, Fengli, Fengyuan, Fugang, Fufeng, Nanrong, Yanwan, Beinan, Nanwang, Fengtian, Xinyuan, Jianhe, Jianxing, Jianye, Zhiben and Jiannong Village.

Government institutions
 Taitung County Government
 Taitung County Council

Education

 National Taitung Junior College
 National Taitung University

Tourist attractions
 Beinan Cultural Park
 Datong Theater
 Fugang Fishery Harbor
 kararuan (加路蘭) Recreation Area 

 Liyushan (鯉魚山) Park 
 Makabahai Park (馬卡巴嗨公園)
 Moving Castle
 National Museum of Prehistory
 Paposogan (Seaside Park)
 Taitung Aboriginal Gallery
 Taitung Art Museum
 Taitung Chinese Association
 Taitung Forest Park
 Pipa Lake
 Taitung Performing Art Center
 Taitung Railway Art Village
 Taitung Story Museum
 Tiehua Music Village (鐵花村)
 Xiao Yehliu (小野柳)
 Zhiben Wetlands

Transportation

TRA: Hwa-tung Line, South-Link Line
 Taitung Station
 Kangle Station
 Zhiben Station
Taiwan Provincial Highway System
Provincial Highway No. 9
Provincial Highway No. 11
Port
 Fugang Fishery Harbor - ferry port to Orchid Island and Green Island
Airport
Taitung Airport

Notable natives
 Jia Jia, singer and songwriter.

References

External links

County-administered cities of Taiwan
Populated places in Taitung County